This article lists the oldest known surviving free-standing buildings constructed in the world, including on each of the continents and within each country. A building is defined as any human-made structure used or interface for supporting or sheltering any use or continuous occupancy. In order to qualify for this list a structure must:
 be a recognisable building;
 incorporate features of building work from the claimed date to at least 1.5 metres (4.9 ft) in height;
 be largely complete or include building work to this height for most of its perimeter.
 contain an enclosed area with at least one entry point.
This deliberately excludes ruins of limited height and statues. The list also excludes:
 dolmens, a type of single-chamber megalithic tomb, usually consisting of three or more upright stones supporting a large flat horizontal capstone. Dolmens were typically covered with earth or smaller stones to form a tumulus (which are included in the list). In many instances, that covering has weathered away, leaving only the stone "skeleton" of the burial mound intact. Neolithic dolmens are extremely numerous, with over 1,000 reported from Mecklenburg-Vorpommern in Germany alone.
 cairns, which are simply large piles of loose stones (as opposed to chambered cairns) 
 standing stone rings, such as Stonehenge, also do not count because they are not enclosed and do not have roofs.

Dates for many of the oldest structures have been arrived at by radiocarbon dating and should be considered approximate.

By age
The following are amongst the oldest buildings in the world that have maintained the requirements to be such.  Occupation sites with older human made structures such as those in Göbekli Tepe do exist, but the structures are monuments and do not meet the definition of building (which can be seen above). Many of the buildings within the list contain primarily bricks, but most importantly maintain their walls and roof. There are numerous extant structures that survive in the Orkney islands of Scotland, some of the best known of which are part of the Heart of Neolithic Orkney World Heritage Site. The list also contains many large buildings from the Egyptian Age of the Pyramids.

By continent
The following are amongst the oldest known surviving extant buildings on each of the major continents.

By country
The following are among the oldest buildings in their respective countries.

By function, structure and building material
The following are probably the oldest buildings of their type.

See also
Lists
 List of oldest buildings in Scotland
 List of oldest buildings in the Americas
 List of oldest buildings in the United Kingdom
 List of oldest church buildings
 List of oldest continuously inhabited cities
 List of oldest synagogues
 List of the oldest buildings in the United States
 List of the oldest mosques

Sites
 Los Millares, a Chalcolithic site in Almería, Spain including both ruins and reconstructions
Antequera Dolmens Site, Antequera Málaga Spain, s a cultural heritage ensemble comprising 3 cultural monuments.

References

Historic preservation
 
Old